Pictet may refer to:

Surname
 Adolphe Pictet (1799–1875), Swiss linguist
 Amé Pictet (1857–1937), Swiss chemist
 Benedict Pictet (1655–1724), Genevan theologian
 Charles Pictet de Rochemont (1755–1824), Swiss politician
 Francis Pictet (born 1866), Australian cricketer
 François Jules Pictet de la Rive (1809–1872), Swiss zoologist and palaeontologist
 Jean Pictet (1914–2002), Swiss citizen, jurist, legal practitioner, honorary doctorate
 Marc-Auguste Pictet (1752–1825), Swiss physicist
 Marion MacMillan Pictet, American heiress
 Raoul Pictet (1846–1929), Swiss physicist, one of the first two people to liquefy oxygen

Other uses
 Pictet (crater), crater on the moon, named after Marc-Auguste Pictet
 Pictet-Gams isoquinoline synthesis, variation on the Bischler–Napieralski reaction producing Isoquinoline
 Pictet-Hubert reaction, producing Phenanthridine from the 2-aminobiphenyl – formaldehyde adduct and zinc chloride
 Pictet–Spengler reaction, chemical reaction in which a β-arylethylamine is heated in the presence of an aldehyde and acid
 The Pictet Group, Geneva-based Swiss bank

See also
 Pic-Pic, Piccard & Pictet, Swiss automobile
 LeRoy and Pictet, co-operative company which recruited Germans to settle in Russia in the 18th century
 Prix Pictet (Pictet prize), international award in photography and sustainability
 Pictetia